Edgerton High School is a public high school in Edgerton, Ohio.  It is the only high school in the Edgerton Local Schools district.  Their mascot is the Bulldog.  They are a member of the Green Meadows Conference.

Notable alumni
 Denny Stark, former Major League Baseball player

Ohio High School Athletic Association State Championships

 Boys Basketball – 1959 
Wrestling Individual champions
Keven Miller - 1976, 145 lbs
Tom Nye - 1990, 145 lbs
Tom Nye - 1991, 152 lbs
Jeraco Speelman - 1996, 160 lbs
Track and Field Individual Champions
 Richard Lutterbein 1942
 Cathy Taylor 1981
 Kylee Studer 800 Meter 1997
 Kylee Studer 800 Meter 1998

References

External links
 District website

High schools in Williams County, Ohio
Public high schools in Ohio